Byzantine tower of Biccari is a building located in city center of Biccari, a city in Province of Foggia in Italy.

External links 
  Byzantine tower of Biccari on Biccari official web site.

Towers_in_Italy
Byzantine military architecture
Byzantine Italy